Carlos Oswaldo Pano Becerra (born 29 May 1959) is a Mexican politician affiliated with the Institutional Revolutionary Party. He served as a federal deputy of the LIX Legislature of the Mexican Congress representing Chiapas, and previously served as a local deputy in the LVII Legislature of the Congress of Chiapas. He was also the municipal president of Metapa de Domínguez from 1986 to 1988.

References

1959 births
Living people
Institutional Revolutionary Party politicians
Members of the Congress of Chiapas
Municipal presidents in Chiapas
Politicians from Chiapas
20th-century Mexican politicians
21st-century Mexican politicians
Deputies of the LIX Legislature of Mexico
Members of the Chamber of Deputies (Mexico) for Chiapas